Vichyssoise, is a soup made of cooked and puréed leeks, potatoes, onions and cream. It is served chilled and garnished with chopped chives. It was invented in the first quarter of the 20th century by Louis Diat, a French-born cook working as head chef of the Ritz-Carlton Hotel in New York.

History

Background
Leek and potato soup is a traditional staple of French cuisine. Elizabeth David (1984) comments that the ancestor of vichyssoise was "every French housewife's potato and leek soup". 19th-century French cookbooks give recipes for a simple leek and potato soup, called potage Parmentier or potage à la Parmentier.

Creation 
Vichyssoise was the invention of the chef Louis Félix Diat. He was born in Montmarault in the Allier department of France near the spa town of Vichy. He and his brother Lucien were taught to cook by their mother; Lucien became chef de cuisine of the Hôtel Plaza Athénée in Paris. Louis trained under César Ritz at the Paris Ritz and the London Ritz. He emigrated to the US and became head chef of the newly opened Ritz-Carlton Hotel in New York in 1911, remaining there until it closed in 1951, when he retired.

The most celebrated of the dishes Diat created at the Ritz-Carlton was vichyssoise. In a book published posthumously, he explained the background:

Sources vary about when Diat first introduced vichyssoise to the menu of the Ritz-Carlton. Betty Fussell proposes 1910 as the year, although the hotel did not open until the following year. Several sources give the year as 1917, but there is no conclusive contemporary evidence for this. The soup was first mentioned in a French publication in 1923 in La Revue culinaire, which classified it as an item of American cuisine. It has never achieved the popularity in France that it has in the US and Britain.

Ingredients
Unlike long-familiar classic French dishes, the recipes for which vary, sometimes considerably, from region to region and generation to generation, the creator's recipe for vichyssoise is set out in print. In Diat's Gourmet's Basic French Cookbook: Techniques of French Cuisine (1961) the ingredients are listed as potatoes, leeks and onions. They are cooked in light (single) cream and milk. The soup is chilled, and heavy (double) cream and chopped chives are added before serving. 

Some later recipes stipulate, as Diat's does not, that only the white parts of the leeks should be used. Another important variant is the liquid in which the vegetables are simmered: rather than Diat's light cream and milk, chicken stock is specified in recipes by Simone Beck, Louisette Bertholle and Julia Child, in their Mastering the Art of French Cooking (1961),  Craig Claiborne (1969), and Anne Willan (1994). Some recipes omit the onion, or add celery or dry white wine.

Variants
Alan Davidson comments in The Oxford Companion to Food that vichyssoise is so well established that it is sometimes used as a generic term. He gives the example of "a vichyssoise of parsnip and runner beans"; and other published variations include apple vichyssoise, carrot vichyssoise, cucumber vichyssoise, lemon grass vichyssoise, and watercress vichyssoise (using vegetable stock). A completely vegan version dubbed "veggiesoise", using plant-based substitutes for chicken stock and cream, was published in 2005.

Notes

References

Sources

See also

 List of French soups and stews
 List of soups
 List of vegetable dishes
 1971 Bon Vivant botulism case, which involved tinned vichyssoise soup

External links
Traditional recipe for Vichyssoise soup 

Cold soups
French soups
Occitan cuisine
Potato dishes
Leek dishes